Events from the year 1744 in Wales.

Incumbents
Lord Lieutenant of North Wales (Lord Lieutenant of Anglesey, Caernarvonshire, Denbighshire, Flintshire, Merionethshire, Montgomeryshire) – George Cholmondeley, 3rd Earl of Cholmondeley 
Lord Lieutenant of Glamorgan – Charles Powlett, 3rd Duke of Bolton
Lord Lieutenant of Brecknockshire and Lord Lieutenant of Monmouthshire – Thomas Morgan
Lord Lieutenant of Cardiganshire – Wilmot Vaughan, 3rd Viscount Lisburne (from 10 May)
Lord Lieutenant of Carmarthenshire – vacant until 1755
Lord Lieutenant of Pembrokeshire – Sir Arthur Owen, 3rd Baronet
Lord Lieutenant of Radnorshire – James Brydges, 1st Duke of Chandos (until 9 August); 

Bishop of Bangor – Matthew Hutton (from 13 November)
Bishop of Llandaff – John Gilbert
Bishop of St Asaph – Samuel Lisle (from 1 April)
Bishop of St Davids – The Hon. Richard Trevor (from 1 April)

Events
1 April - The Hon. Richard Trevor is consecrated as Bishop of St David's, replacing Edward Willes. Samuel Lisle is consecrated as Bishop of St Asaph on the same day.
18 May - Howell Harris marries Anne Williams.
date unknown - Richard Morris is selected by the S.P.C.K. to supervise the production of its edition of the Welsh Bible.

Arts and literature

New books
Jane Brereton - Poems on several occasions (posthumously published)

Music
William Williams Pantycelyn - Aleluia (first collection of hymns)

Births
6 August - John Hanbury, ironmaster (died 1784)
17 September - Albemarle Bertie, 9th Earl of Lindsey, father of Lady Charlotte Guest (died 1818)
date unknown 
Robert Hughes (Robin Ddu yr Ail or Robin Ddu o Fon), poet (died 1785)
Richard Philipps, 1st Baron Milford (first creation) (died 1823)

Deaths
19 January - Lady Lucy Herbert, writer, 74
2 March - William Maxwell, 5th Earl of Nithsdale, Jacobite, husband of Winifred Herbert, 67
9 August - James Brydges, 1st Duke of Chandos, Lord Lieutenant of Radnorshire, 71
21 September - William Nevill, 16th Baron Bergavenny, about 45

References

Wales
Wales